Padenodes is a genus of moths in the family Erebidae.

Species
 Padenodes cuprizona Hampson, 1914
 Padenodes unifascia Rothschild, 1912

References

Natural History Museum Lepidoptera generic names catalog

Nudariina
Moth genera